The Americas Zone is one of the three zones of regional Davis Cup competition in 2011.

In the Americas Zone there are four different groups in which teams compete against each other to advance to the next group.

Participating teams

Seeds

Other Nations

Draw

 and  relegated to Group III in 2012.
 promoted to Group I in 2012.

First round

Peru vs. Netherlands Antilles

El Salvador vs. Dominican Republic

Puerto Rico vs. Paraguay

Venezuela vs. Haiti

Playoff round

El Salvador vs. Netherlands Antilles

Puerto Rico vs. Haiti

Second round

Peru vs. Dominican Republic

Venezuela vs. Paraguay

Third round

Peru vs. Paraguay

References

External links
Davis Cup draw details

Americas Zone Group II
Davis Cup Americas Zone